Heather Cameron may refer to:

 Lifeguard (comics), a Marvel Comics superhero, with the alter ego Heather Cameron
 Heather Cameron (professor), Canadian and British social theorist and social entrepreneur